Byron Cherry (born April 17, 1955 in Atlanta, Georgia) is an American actor. He portrayed Coy Duke, one of the new Duke Boys, in the 1982–1983 season of The Dukes of Hazzard for the first 19 episodes of season 5.

The Dukes of Hazzard
In 1978, Cherry, along with longtime friend John Schneider, auditioned for the part of Bo Duke on the upcoming Dukes of Hazzard. Schneider ended up winning the part, to which he found much success. A few years later, due to merchandising conflicts, Schneider and co-star Tom Wopat walked out on the show, and Cherry, along with Christopher Mayer, were called in to replace them as Coy and Vance Duke. Cherry and Mayer both made their debuts on Dukes in September 1982. Despite fairly similar physical and behavioral resemblances to the familiar leads played by Wopat and Schneider, Cherry and Mayer's characters of Coy and Vance were not accepted by viewing audience, and ratings for the popular series began to sag during the 19 episodes in which they appeared. By the middle of the 1982–83 season, Warner Bros. came to new agreeable salary terms with Wopat and Schneider, and in February 1983, both of the original stars returned to the show. Cherry and Mayer appeared alongside Wopat and Schneider briefly in the episode of Bo and Luke's return, and then were written out of the show and never mentioned again.

Later career
Under a three-year contract with Warner Bros., Cherry went on to appear on numerous television shows such as Murder, She Wrote, In the Heat of the Night and Vietnam War Story, as well as various TV commercials and guest spots on numerous talk shows. He was also a spokesperson for the American Cancer Society.

Filmography

External links

1955 births
Living people
American male television actors
Male actors from Atlanta